This is a list of the top 50 National Football League quarterbacks career regular season passing completions and attempts, of quarterback playoff completions and attempts by players with over 250 playoff completions, and combined career totals.

Tom Brady is the all-time leader in passing completions with 7,753 and passing attempts with 12,050. He also leads in playoff completions and attempts with 1,200 and 1,921, respectively.

Regular season completions leaders

Through  season.

Playoff leaders
Through  playoffs. At least 250 completions.

Historical passing completions leaders
Nine players are recognised as having held the record as the NFL's career pass completions leader.  The longest record holder was Fran Tarkenton who held the record for 20 years.

Notes

See also
 List of gridiron football quarterbacks passing statistics
 List of National Football League career passing touchdowns leaders
 List of National Football League career passing yards leaders
 List of National Football League career quarterback wins leaders
 List of National Football League records (individual)

References
PFRef.com enumeration of career passing completions leaders

Passing
Passing completions leaders

National Football League lists